The Ghazipur City–Shri Mata Vaishno Devi Katra Express is an Express train belonging to Northern Railway zone that runs between   and  in India. It is currently being operated with 14611/14612 train numbers on a weekly basis.

Service

The 14611/Ghazipur City–Shri Mata Vaishno Devi Katra Express has an average speed of 49 km/hr and covers 1391 km in 28h 15m. The 14612/Shri Mata Vaishno Devi Katra–Ghazipur City Express has an average speed of 56 km/hr and covers 1391 km in 24h 50m.

Schedule

Route and halts 

The important halts of the train are:

Coach composition

The train has standard LHB rakes with max speed of 130 kmph. The train consists of 18 coaches:

 1 AC II Tier
 4 AC III Tier
 7 Sleeper coaches
 1 Pantry car
 3 General Unreserved
 2 End-on Generator

Traction

Both trains are hauled by a Ludhiana Loco Shed-based WAP-4 electric locomotive from Ghazipur City to Lucknow Shri Mata Vaishno Devi Katra for the remainder journey and vice versa.

Direction reversal

The train reverses its direction 1 times:

See also 

 Shri Mata Vaishno Devi Katra railway station
 Ghazipur City railway station

Notes

References

External links 

 14611/Ghazipur City - Shri Mata Vaishno Devi Katra Weekly Express
 14612/Shri Mata Vaishno Devi Katra - Ghazipur City Weekly Express

Transport in Katra, Jammu and Kashmir
Transport in Ghazipur
Express trains in India
Rail transport in Jammu and Kashmir
Rail transport in Punjab, India
Rail transport in Haryana
Rail transport in Uttarakhand
Rail transport in Uttar Pradesh
Railway services introduced in 2017